Urban Dreams, is an album by jazz baritone saxophonist Pepper Adams which was recorded in 1981 and originally released on the Palo Alto label.

Reception

The Allmusic review by Scott Yanow states: "it is one of his best recordings". On All About Jazz, Derek Taylor said "Pepper Adams' memory lives on in this immensely enjoyable and easily recommendable album". The Penguin Guide to Jazz described the album as "a late, great flowering of Pepper's talent".

Track listing
All compositions by Pepper Adams, except where indicated.
 "Dexter Rides Again" (Dexter Gordon) – 6:27
 "Urban Dreams" – 4:44		
 "Three Little Words"  (Harry Ruby, Bert Kalmar) – 7:18
 "Time on My Hands" (Vincent Youmans, Harold Adamson, Mack Gordon) – 6:55
 "Pent Up House" (Sonny Rollins) – 7:04
 "Trentino" – 6:51

Personnel
Pepper Adams – baritone saxophone
Jimmy Rowles – piano
George Mraz – bass
Billy Hart – drums

References

Pepper Adams albums
1981 albums
Palo Alto Records albums
Albums recorded at Van Gelder Studio